David Samuel Horne MacDonald  (born August 20, 1936) is a Canadian United Church of Canada minister,  former politician, and author.

Early life
Born in Charlottetown, Prince Edward Island, David MacDonald was ordained in the United Church by the Maritime Conference on June 11, 1961, and was a minister at Alberton, Tignish, and Cascumpec, Prince Edward Island before going into federal politics.

Political career
He was first elected to the House of Commons of Canada as a Progressive Conservative Member of Parliament (MP) from the former Prince Edward Island riding of Prince in the 1965 election, and was re-elected in the realigned Egmont riding from 1968 until 1979.

After the Tory victory in the 1979 election, he was appointed Minister of Communications, Minister responsible for the Status of Women and Secretary of State for Canada in the short-lived Cabinet of Prime Minister Joe Clark.

MacDonald lost his seat to Liberal George Henderson in the 1980 election but returned to the House as MP in the Toronto riding of Rosedale in the 1988 election, replacing former Toronto Mayor and PC incumbent David Crombie.

However, he lost his seat again to a Liberal majority government in the 1993 election, this time to Bill Graham. Two other notable candidates ran against MacDonald in this election: future New Democratic Party (NDP) leader Jack Layton, and magician Doug Henning for the Natural Law Party of Canada.

MacDonald also spent time in Africa between parliamentary duties.

MacDonald had a reputation as a Red Tory and subsequently switched his political allegiance to the social democratic New Democratic Party of Canada. He ran as the NDP candidate in his old riding (now called Toronto Centre-Rosedale) in the 1997 election, but was defeated again by Graham.

After politics
On November 25, 1998, The United Church of Canada appointed MacDonald a Special Advisor on residential schools, in light of major lawsuits against the UCC from former students.

Personal life
MacDonald was romantically involved with Alexa McDonough who at the time was leader of the federal NDP, prior to his 1997 candidacy. However, they split up prior to the 2004 federal election. MacDonald has since started another relationship and married.

Electoral record

Toronto Centre—Rosedale

Rosedale

Egmont

Prince

Archives 
There is a David S.H. MacDonald fonds at Library and Archives Canada.

Notes

External links
 
United Church of Canada's appointment as Special Advisor for Residential Schools

1936 births
Living people
People from Charlottetown
Ministers of the United Church of Canada
Members of the 21st Canadian Ministry
Members of the House of Commons of Canada from Ontario
Members of the House of Commons of Canada from Prince Edward Island
Members of the King's Privy Council for Canada
Progressive Conservative Party of Canada MPs